Raymond Neri d'Entremont (August 29, 1875 – January 26, 1974) was a fish merchant and political figure in Nova Scotia, Canada. He represented Yarmouth County in the Nova Scotia House of Assembly from 1925 to 1928 as a Liberal-Conservative member.

Early life and education
He was born in West Pubnico, Nova Scotia, the son of François Xavier Isaïe d'Entremont and Natalie Pothier, and was educated at St. Anne's College.

Death
He died at Waterville in Kings County at the age of 98.

Personal life
He married Sadie M. d'Entremont in 1907.

References 
 A Directory of the Members of the Legislative Assembly of Nova Scotia, 1758-1958, Public Archives of Nova Scotia (1958)

1875 births
1974 deaths
Progressive Conservative Association of Nova Scotia MLAs
Acadian people
People from Yarmouth County